The 1936 United States presidential election in Rhode Island was held on November 3, 1936. The state voters chose four electors to the Electoral College, who voted for president and vice president.

Rhode Island voted for Democratic Party candidate and incumbent President Franklin D. Roosevelt, who won the state by a margin of 12.92%.

Results

By county

See also
 United States presidential elections in Rhode Island

References

Rhode Island
1936
1936 Rhode Island elections